The Manitoba Moose are a professional ice hockey team based in Winnipeg, Manitoba, Canada, and a member of the American Hockey League (AHL). The team plays its home games at Canada Life Centre, the home arena of its parent club, Winnipeg Jets of the National Hockey League (NHL).

The franchise was founded in 1994 as the Minnesota Moose, then playing in the International Hockey League (IHL). The Moose played fifteen seasons—five in the IHL (1996–2001) and ten in the AHL (2001–2011)—during their first tenure in Winnipeg. This was followed by four seasons in St. John's, Newfoundland and Labrador, (2011–2015) during which the team was known as the St. John's IceCaps. The team returned to Winnipeg prior to the 2015–16 season.

History

International Hockey League (1996–2001) 
Following the departure of the original Winnipeg Jets franchise to Phoenix in 1996, a group of local businessmen, including Mark Chipman, purchased the Minnesota Moose of the IHL. The team was relocated to Winnipeg to provide a new tenant for the Winnipeg Arena and keep professional hockey in the city.

The team's first season in Winnipeg was a disaster. Former Montreal Canadiens coach Jean Perron was brought in to replace Frank Serratore as head coach and general manager. The Moose won only 16 of 50 games under Perron before he was fired from both positions on January 4, 1997.  Upon his dismissal, Perron lashed out at team ownership, the media, and the players, including a personal attack on team captain Randy Gilhen. Perron threatened legal action against the organization though no lawsuit was ever filed. Assistant coach Randy Carlyle took over as interim head coach for the remainder of the season and led the team to a winning record in their final 32 games of the season, but it was not enough to qualify for the playoffs.

Carlyle served as the head coach and general manager for team's final four seasons in the IHL. The Moose had moderate regular season success and qualified for the Turner Cup playoffs three times, making it as far as the second round. Carlyle was named the league's General Manager of the Year for the 1998–99 season.  The Moose remained an independent club while playing in the IHL, electing not to affiliate with a NHL team.

American Hockey League (2001–present)

2001–2011: Move to the AHL
The Moose and five other IHL clubs were accepted into the AHL upon the former's demise in 2001, and the team became the top affiliate of the Vancouver Canucks. This partnership lasted until the NHL's return to Winnipeg in 2011. Former Canucks star Stan Smyl was chosen by the Canucks as the new head coach of the Moose while Carlyle stayed on as general manager for one season before leaving to join the Washington Capitals coaching staff. In 2002–03, Smyl led the team to the second round of the Calder Cup playoffs, but lost to the Hamilton Bulldogs in seven games. After the team missed the playoffs the following season, Smyl was reassigned within the Canucks organization.

Following the departure of Smyl, Carlyle returned as head coach for the 2004–05 season. It was a season of big changes and new heights of success for the organization.  The Manitoba Moose Hockey Club, now owned by True North Sports & Entertainment, played its final game at the old Winnipeg Arena and moved into the brand new MTS Centre (since renamed Bell MTS Place and now Canada Life Centre). The Moose advanced as far as the conference final for the first time in team history but were swept in four games by their old IHL rivals, the Chicago Wolves.  Mark Chipman was awarded the James C. Hendy Memorial Award for AHL Executive of the Year. After the season, Carlyle was hired by the Anaheim Ducks as their new head coach, becoming the first of four consecutive Moose head coaches to leave the team for head coaching positions in the NHL.

Former Canadiens head coach Alain Vigneault was hired by the Vancouver Canucks as the new Moose head coach for the 2005–06 season. Winnipeg native and three-time Stanley Cup champion Mike Keane also joined the club as their new team captain. Keane quickly became a fan favourite and the team had another great year, but again lost in the second round of the playoffs. After the season, Vigneault was promoted by the Canucks to fill their vacant head coaching position when Marc Crawford was dismissed.

Former Moose captain and assistant coach Scott Arniel was selected to replace Vigneault. Arniel coached the team for four seasons and, in 2008–09, led them to their best season in franchise history when the team finished with 107 points, the best record in the league. In the second round of the 2009 Calder Cup Playoffs, the Moose completed their first playoff sweep in franchise history, defeating the Grand Rapids Griffins. After beating the Houston Aeros in six games to win the Western Conference final, the Moose advanced to the Calder Cup finals for the first time, but lost the championship series in six games to the Hershey Bears.  Arniel was awarded the Louis A. R. Pieri Memorial Award as the AHL Coach of the Year, while general manager Craig Heisinger became the second member of the Moose front office staff to win the James C. Hendy Memorial Award.

Arniel became the third Moose coach in six years to make the jump to the NHL when he was hired by the Columbus Blue Jackets as their new head coach in 2010. Ironically, Arniel was replaced by the person he replaced in Columbus, Claude Noël. During the same off-season, Keane's contract was not renewed and his #12 jersey was later retired on Mike Keane Tribute Night, February 12, 2011. During the 2011 playoffs, the Moose came back from a three games to one deficit to the Lake Erie Monsters in the first round to advance. They fell behind three games to one again in round two, this time to the Hamilton Bulldogs, and came back to force a seventh game. However, the Bulldogs took the series with a 2–1 win in triple overtime in the longest Game 7 in AHL history.

During their first tenure in the AHL, the Moose were one of the league's most successful franchises. Home game attendance was consistently among the best in the league, including an average of 8,404 per game during the 2010–2011 season. The organization was also popular with the players, as the Moose "had the reputation of being run like an NHL club". League president and CEO David Andrews called the Moose "a flagship franchise for the AHL".

2011–2015: St. John's IceCaps

On May 31, 2011, Mark Chipman announced True North Sports and Entertainment's acquisition of the NHL's Atlanta Thrashers with the intent of relocating the team to Winnipeg for the 2011–12 season. The return of NHL hockey to the city prompted the organization to find a new home for the AHL franchise. A deal with former Premier of Newfoundland and Labrador Danny Williams was quickly negotiated to relocate the team to St. John's, Newfoundland and Labrador and swiftly approved by the AHL Board of Governors. The Moose brand was dropped in consideration of Newfoundland's history of fatal vehicle collisions involving the large animal; instead, the team was renamed the St. John's IceCaps. The IceCaps were then named new AHL affiliate of the Winnipeg Jets, ending the AHL team's ten-year affiliation with the Vancouver Canucks.

The success of the franchise continued in St. John's. Attendance at Mile One Centre was strong; the IceCaps enjoyed the second longest home sellout streak in league history at 120 games between 2011 and 2014.  In 2011–12, the IceCaps won their division and advanced as far as the conference final. In 2013–14, the IceCaps advanced to the Calder Cup finals for the second time in franchise history, but lost to the Texas Stars in five games.

2015–present: Return to Manitoba
As early as January 2014, True North Sports and Entertainment confirmed intentions to move its AHL franchise closer to Winnipeg, with Thunder Bay, Ontario as the preferred destination. Although the agreement with Williams' group had been extended through 2016, the two sides terminated the deal after Williams negotiated an agreement to bring the Montreal Canadiens AHL affiliate, Hamilton Bulldogs, to St. John's for the 2015–16 season.  The IceCaps' trademarks were retained by Williams' group and transferred to the incoming franchise.

As a new arena in Thunder Bay was not forthcoming, True North Sports and Entertainment's AHL franchise returned to Winnipeg for the 2015–16 season and once again became the Manitoba Moose Hockey Club. Slight changes to the former logo were unveiled, as well as a new colour scheme similar to that of the Jets.  Keith McCambridge, who had been with the franchise since 2009, remained as head coach.

After one season in Manitoba and missing the playoffs for the second straight season, McCambridge was released by the organization and replaced by Jets assistant coach Pascal Vincent.  The Moose missed the playoffs again in Vincent's first season, but a much improved performance during the 2017–18 season returned the Moose to playoffs again.  Vincent was awarded the Louis A.R. Pieri Memorial Award for AHL coach of the year, while players Sami Niku and Mason Appleton also captured major awards.  Vincent stepped down as head coach following the shortened 2020–21 season and was replaced by Mark Morrison, who was previously an assistant coach with the team from 2011 to 2017.

Team information

Logos and uniforms
The current Manitoba Moose uniforms are similar to those of the Winnipeg Jets, whose colours are polar night blue, aviator blue, silver, and white.  However, unlike the Jets, the Moose wear their white uniforms for home games in accordance with AHL rules.  During their IHL days, the Moose colours were purple, green, and copper.  The team switched to teal, copper, and black after joining the AHL.

The original Minnesota Moose logo, depicting a Moose holding a hockey stick, was carried over when the team moved from Minnesota in 1996.  The logo was slightly altered in 2001 to match the team's new colour scheme.  A new logo created by Milwaukee-based graphic designer David Mann was introduced in 2004 (coinciding with the team's move from Winnipeg Arena to MTS Centre), which the team used until 2011. The Moose returned to a similar logo upon returning to the AHL in 2015, albeit with an altered colour scheme and other slight changes in order to conform with the Winnipeg Jets brand.

Mascot
Mick E. Moose debuted as the mascot of the Manitoba Moose in 1996.  The Winnipeg Jets "recalled" him from the AHL in 2011 to become their mascot following the departure of the Moose to St. John's. He has served as the official mascot for both teams since 2015.  Aside from hockey games, Mick E. Moose makes approximately 100 public appearances each year at various community events.

Media
680 CJOB airs select Moose games on radio and streams all games on the internet. Daniel Fink is the team's Manager of Hockey Communications and play-by-play broadcaster. Fink began calling Moose games in 2019, taking over from Mitch Peacock (2015-2019). TSN Radio 1290 (CFRW) held broadcasting rights from 2015 to 2020.  CJOB previously held radio broadcast rights from 1996 to 2011, with Kelly Moore (1996–2006) and Brian Munz (2006–2011) as play-by-play announcers.

CKY-TV previously televised select Moose games from 1996 to 1999, and A-Channel aired select games during the 2000-01 season. For the 2022 Calder Cup playoffs, home playoff games were televised on TSN.

Venue
The Manitoba Moose play their home games at Canada Life Centre (previously the MTS Centre and Bell MTS Place), which they share with the Winnipeg Jets, and are currently one of three AHL clubs (the others being the Calgary Wranglers and San Jose Barracuda) to share a home arena with its NHL parent club. Although the arena seats 15,321 for hockey, only the lower bowl (which seats 8,812) is open for most Moose games. Practices and training sessions are usually held at Bell MTS Iceplex. The Moose briefly relocated to the Iceplex from March to May 2021 when COVID-19 pandemic protocols made the regular home arena unsuitable for hosting multiple clubs.

The team played at the Winnipeg Arena prior to the opening of Canada Life Centre in November 2004.

Season-by-season results

Players

Current roster
Updated March 17, 2023.

|}

Team captains

 Randy Gilhen, 1996–1997
 Scott Arniel, 1997–1999
 Brian Chapman, 1999–2003
 Dallas Eakins, 2003–2004
 Nolan Baumgartner, 2004–2005, 2010–2011
 Mike Keane, 2005–2010
 John Albert, 2015–2016
 Patrice Cormier, 2016–2018
 Peter Stoykewych, 2018–2020
 Jimmy Oligny, 2021–present

Retired numbers

Although not officially retired, the team has not issued jersey number 11 since 2012 in honour of former player Rick Rypien, who died shortly after signing with the Winnipeg Jets in 2011.  The Moose and Jets also wear #11 decals on their helmets as part of the organization's Project11 campaign for mental health awareness.

Head coaches

 Jean Perron, 1996–1997 
 Randy Carlyle, 1997–2001, 2004–2005
 Stan Smyl, 2001–2004  
 Alain Vigneault, 2005–2006 
 Scott Arniel, 2006–2010 
 Claude Noel, 2010–2011 
 Keith McCambridge, 2015–2016 
 Pascal Vincent, 2016–2021
 Mark Morrison, 2021–present

Team records
Single season
Goals: 45 Scott Thomas (1998–99)
Assists: 81 Stephane Morin (1994–95)
Points: 114 Stephane Morin (1994–95)
Penalty minutes: 285 Wade Brookbank (2004–05)
Wins: 35 Cory Schneider (2009–10)
GAA: 2.04  Cory Schneider (2008–09)
SV%: .935  Michael Hutchinson (2017–18)

Career
Career goals: 158 Jason Jaffray
Career assists: 244 Jason Jaffray
Career points: 402 Jason Jaffray
Career penalty minutes: 1434 Jimmy Roy
Career goaltending wins: 84 Cory Schneider
Career shutouts: 12 Cory Schneider
Career games: 603 Jimmy Roy

Team scoring leaders
These are the top-ten point-scorers in team history. Figures are updated after each completed regular season.

Note: Pos = Position; GP = Games Played; G = Goals; A = Assists; Pts = Points; P/G = Points per game;  = current  Moose player

Team general managers
 Jean Perron, 1996–97 (fired 50 games into first season)
 Randy Carlyle, 1997–2002 (became Washington Capitals assistant coach)
 Craig Heisinger, 2002–present (held position with franchise in St. John's from 2011 to 2015)

See also
List of ice hockey teams in Manitoba

References

External links
The Internet Hockey Database – Manitoba Moose (AHL)
The Internet Hockey Database – Manitoba Moose (IHL)
Official Manitoba Moose website

 
Ice hockey clubs established in 1996
Sports clubs disestablished in 2011
Ice hockey clubs established in 2015
2015 establishments in Manitoba